Purgation is the debut album of the British death metal band Trigger the Bloodshed. It was released on 18 February 2008 by Rising Records and in August 2008 by Metal Blade Records.

Background and reception
Purgation was recorded from August to September 2007, produced by Mark Daghorn and mixed by Karl Groom and released by Rising Records in February 2008. The band gained praise from the English press, in particular Kerrang!, Terrorizer and Metal Hammer and signed to Metal Blade Records. Purgation was subsequently re-released by Metal Blade in U.S., Canada, Australia and Japan.

Track listing

Personnel
Trigger the Bloodshed
Charlie Holmes – vocals
Rob Purnell – lead guitar, backing vocals
Martyn Evans – rhythm guitar
Jamie O'Rourke – bass
Max Blunos – drums

Production
Mark Daghorn – production, engineering
Karl Groom – mixing
David Aston – mastering

References

2008 debut albums
Trigger the Bloodshed albums
Metal Blade Records albums